György Nébald (born 9 March 1956) is a Hungarian sabre fencer, who has won three Olympic medals in the team sabre competition.

Awards
 Hungarian fencer of the Year (4): 1985, 1987, 1988, 1990
  Order of Merit of the Hungarian People's Republic – Order of Stars (1988)
   Cross of Merit of the Republic of the Hungary – Golden Cross (1992)
 Kemény Ferenc award (1993)
 Fencer Head Coach of the Year - Hungary (2010)

References

1956 births
Living people
Hungarian male sabre fencers
Fencers at the 1980 Summer Olympics
Fencers at the 1988 Summer Olympics
Fencers at the 1992 Summer Olympics
Olympic fencers of Hungary
Olympic gold medalists for Hungary
Olympic silver medalists for Hungary
Olympic bronze medalists for Hungary
Olympic medalists in fencing
Martial artists from Budapest
Medalists at the 1980 Summer Olympics
Medalists at the 1988 Summer Olympics
Medalists at the 1992 Summer Olympics